Stare Miasto is a village in the administrative district of Gmina Leżajsk, within Leżajsk County, Subcarpathian Voivodeship, in south-eastern Poland.

It was the former location of the nearby town of Leżajsk, which was eventually moved to its present location in 1524 by Polish King Sigismund I the Old. Afterwards, as Stare Miasto ("Old Town") it was a royal village of the Polish Crown.

References

Stare Miasto